Handel Architects LLP is an architecture firm that was founded in New York City in 1994. Led by Partner Gary Handel, the firm has offices in New York City, Boston, San Francisco, and Hong Kong. 

The firm has five partners, Gary Handel, Blake Middleton, Glenn Rescalvo, Frank Fusaro, and Michael Arad. Well-known projects include Cornell University's New York City Tech Campus Residential Tower, Millennium Tower ,  the Ritz-Carlton in Washington, DC, and the National September 11 Memorial in Lower Manhattan.

Works and projects

United States

New York City
 Madison House, NoMad, Manhattan
 The Essex at Essex Crossing, New York, NY
 180 Broome at Essex Crossing, New York, NY
 One Blue Slip, Greenpoint, Brooklyn
 Cornell Tech Campus Residential Tower, New York, NY
 Sendero Verde, Harlem, New York, NY
 Pier 57 (SuperPier) Renovation and Restoration, New York, NY
 Enclave at The Cathedral of St. John the Divine, New York, NY
 National September 11 Memorial, Lower Manhattan, New York, NY
 The Dominick, SoHo
 33 Bond, Brooklyn, New York
 House 39, New York, NY
 Dream Downtown Hotel, Chelsea, Manhattan
 37 Warren Street, New York, NY
 Inspir Carnegie Hill, New York, NY
 Fifth Street Farm Green Roof, New York, NY
 150 East 72nd Street Renovation, New York, NY
 530 Park Avenue Renovation, New York, NY
 The Caledonia, New York, NY
 737 Park Avenue Renovation, New York, NY
 Ritz-Carlton, Battery Park, New York, NY
 The Corner at 200 W 72nd Street, New York, NY
 Lincoln West, New York, NY
 Lincoln Triangle, New York, NY
 Lincoln Square, New York, NY
 455, 505 West 37th Street, New York, NY
 525 West 52nd Street, New York, NY
 Millennium Point (New York City), New York, NY
 255 Hudson Street, New York, NY
 505 Greenwich Street, New York, NY
 Truffles Tribeca, New York, NY
 Ritz-Carlton Central Park, New York, NY
 Aire at 150 Amsterdam, New York, NY
 170 Amsterdam, New York, NY
 Long Island City Marriott and Aurora Residences, Queens, NY
 Flushing Meadows Natatorium, Flushing Meadows–Corona Park, Queens, NY
 The View at Queens West, Queens, NY
 Summit, New York, NY
 Hoyt & Horn, Brooklyn, NY
 Linden 78, New York, NY
 The Easton and Windward School, New York, NY
 Idlewild Park Nature Center, Queens, NY

San Francisco
 Serif and The Line Hotel at 950 Market Street, San Francisco
 Four Seasons Private Residences at 706 Mission, San Francisco
 288 Pacific, Jackson Square, San Francisco
 The Pacific, San Francisco
 Rowan at 346 Potrero, San Francisco
 NEMA at 10th and Market, San Francisco
 Millennium Tower (San Francisco), Financial District, San Francisco. 
 950 Tennessee, San Francisco
 Nove Residences, Mission District, San Francisco
 Four Seasons Hotel, San Francisco, San Francisco
 Blu Residences, San Francisco
 340 Fremont Street, San Francisco
 1554 Market Street, San Francisco
 Union House, San Francisco
 450 Hayes Street, San Francisco
 2301 Lombard Street, San Francisco
 570 Jessie Street, San Francisco

Washington, D.C.
 The Ritz-Carlton, Washington, D.C., West End, Washington, D.C.
 The Ritz-Carlton, Georgetown, Washington, D.C.
 3303 Water Street, Washington, D.C.
 Vio & Incanto at The Wharf, Washington, D.C.
 The Bower, Washington, D.C.

Boston
 Winthrop Center (formerly Winthrop Square Tower)
 Ipswich Studio Building at Boston Conservatory, Fenway–Kenmore
 Hemenway Building at Boston Conservatory, Fenway–Kenmore
 Millennium Place, Downtown Crossing
 Millennium Tower Boston, Downtown Crossing
 Ritz-Carlton Hotel & Residences, Downtown Crossing

Jersey City
 Journal Squared

Los Angeles
 Ten Thousand, Los Angeles, CA
 Hollywood Center, Hollywood, Los Angeles, CA
Angels Landing

Santa Barbara
 Santa Barbara Bowl, Santa Barbara, California

Philadelphia
 The Residences at The Ritz-Carlton (Philadelphia), Center City, Philadelphia

Asbury Park
 Asbury Ocean Club Hotel, Asbury Park, New Jersey

Miami
 Four Seasons Hotel Miami, Downtown Miami

Atlanta
 Ritz-Carlton Buckhead Residences and Office

Chicago
 OneEleven, Chicago, IL

Austin
 Austin Proper Hotel & Residences, Austin, TX

Charleston
 Emanuel Nine Memorial, Charleston, SC.

Raleigh
 Quorum Center, Raleigh, NC

Honolulu
 Hokua at 1288 Ala Moana, Honolulu, HI

Weehawken
 1000 Avenue, Weehawken, New Jersey
 1200 Avenue, Weehawken, New Jersey

Chile
 W Hotel Santiago, Santiago
 Territoria El Bosque, Santiago
 Alto El Golf, Santiago

Indonesia
 SSI Tower, Jakarta

Philippines
 Shangri-La at the Fort, Manila, Bonifacio Global City
 Philippine Stock Exchange Tower, Manila,  Bonifacio Global City
 East Gallery Place, Manila,  Bonifacio Global City
 West Gallery Place, Manila,    Bonifacio Global City

Sri Lanka
 Shangri-La Colombo

Taiwan
 Xin Dian Tower, Taipei
 Forworld Le Meridien & Mixed use, New Taipei City
 CMP Taichung Intercontinental Hotel, Taichung

United Arab Emirates
 Rosewood Abu Dhabi, Abu Dhabi
 Aykon City, Dubai

References

External links
 Handel Architects website

Architecture firms based in New York City
Design companies established in 1994
1994 establishments in New York City